The South Carolina Libertarian Party is a ballot-qualified political party in the state of South Carolina. It is the state affiliate party of the national Libertarian Party of the United States. The state chair is Casey Crowe.

Elected officials
As of 2016, there are two Libertarian officeholders in the state of South Carolina, both of whom were elected to non-partisan positions.
 Bill Woolsey – James Island Mayor
 Kathy Rice Woolsey – Soil and Water District Supervisor, Charleston County

2022 South Carolina Election Cycle
Four candidates secured the South Carolina Libertarian Party nomination for statewide offices.
 Dr. Morgan Bruce Reeves and Jessica Ethridge for Governor and Lt. Governor
 John Davis for SC House District 85
 Rodney Travis for SC House District 109

2020 convention and debate

On November 2, 2019, the South Carolina Libertarian Party held its business convention for the 2020 election cycle in Florence, South Carolina.

Delegates and alternates to the 2020 Libertarian National Convention in Austin, Texas, were elected at this convention.

That evening, a Presidential Candidate Debate was held at Francis Marion University Chapman Auditorium.

Libertarian Party candidates meeting the following criteria were invited to participate: Constitutionally qualified to be elected to the office; current sustaining member of the national party; filed with the FEC as a candidate for the Libertarian nomination; and raised $5000 or more from sources other than the candidate or immediate family by the end of Labor Day Weekend. Fusion candidates were disqualified from the debate.

Based on FEC reports and communication with candidates, the following were considered qualified and participated in the debate:

Presidential nominee results in South Carolina

References

External links
 South Carolina Libertarian Party
 South Carolina Libertarian Party candidate listing

South Carolina
Political parties in South Carolina